Best of Mano Negra is a compilation album by Mano Negra, released in 1998. It included their greatest hits from 1988 to 1994.

Track listing
 "Mano Negra" (Manu Chao, Mano Negra) – 0:58
 From In the Hell of Patchinko
 "King Kong Five" (Manu Chao, Mano Negra) – 1:58
 From Puta's Fever
 "Soledad" (Manu Chao) – 2:34
 From Puta's Fever
 "Mala Vida" (Manu Chao) – 2:53
 From Patchanka
 "Sidi H' Bibi" (traditional, arranged by Mano Negra) – 3:27
 From In the Hell of Patchinko
 "Rock Island Line" (traditional, arranged by Mano Negra) – 3:03
 From Patchanka
 "Noche De Accion" (Manu Chao) – 2:45
 From Patchanka
 "Guayaquil City" (Mano Negra, Thomas Darnal) – 3:03
 From Puta's Fever
 "Peligro" (traditional, arranged by Mano Negra) – 2:52
 From Puta's Fever
 "Sueño De Solentiname" (Manu Chao) – 2:51
 From Casa Babylon
 "Indios De Barcelona" (Manu Chao) – 2:01
 From In the Hell of Patchinko
 "Mad Man's Dead" (Manu Chao, Mano Negra) – 2:03
 From In the Hell of Patchinko
 "Señor Matanza" (Manu Chao, Mano Negra) – 4:06
 From Casa Babylon
 "Out Of Time Man" (Manu Chao, Mano Negra) – 3:25
 From King of Bongo
 "Pas Assez De Toi" (Manu Chao, Mano Negra) – 2:19
 From Puta's Fever
 "King Of Bongo" (Manu Chao, Mano Negra) – 3:38
 From King of Bongo
 "Ronde De Nuit" (Manu Chao) – 2:55
 From Patchanka
 "Patchanka" (Manu Chao) – 3:05
 From Patchanka
 "Salga La Luna" (Manu Chao, Mano Negra) – 3:34
 From Patchanka
 "Santa Maradona" (Manu Chao, Mano Negra) – 3:27
 From Casa Babylon
 "El Sur" (Manu Chao, Mano Negra) – 1:00
 From Puta's Fever
 "Long Long Nite" (Manu Chao, Mano Negra) – 3:28
 From King Of Bongo (S)
 "On Telefon" (Manu Chao, Mano Negra) – 1:36
 From Bande Originale Du Livre
 "Darling Darling" (Manu Layotte) – 1:45
 From In the Hell of Patchinko

Band line-up and crew (1988 - 1994)

Guest musicians (1988 - 1994)

Certifications

References 

Mano Negra (band) albums
1998 compilation albums